Zeitschrift für Kristallographie – New Crystal Structures is a bimonthly peer-reviewed scientific journal published in English. Its first issue was published in December 1997 and bore the subtitle "International journal for structural, physical, and chemical aspects of crystalline materials."  Created as a spin-off of Zeitschrift für Kristallographie for reporting novel and refined crystal structures, it began at volume 212 in order to remain aligned with the numbering of the parent journal.  Paul von Groth, Professor of Mineralogy at the University of Strasbourg, established Zeitschrift für Krystallographie und Mineralogie in 1877; after several name changes, the journal adopted its present name, Zeitschrift für Kristallographie – Crystalline Materials, in 2010.

The inaugural editors-in-chief were Hans Georg von Schnering (German Wikipedia profile) of the Max Planck Institute for Solid State Research in Stuttgart and Heinz Hermann Schulz of the Ludwig-Maximilians-Universität München.  In 2016, the editor-in-chief was Hubert Huppertz (Universität Innsbruck). In the last years the journal sharpened its profile as a journal providing new crystal structure determinations (and redeterminations) together with a short description of the source of the material and the most important features of each structure.

Editorial Board

Christian Hübschle, Bayreuth University, Germany; Oliver Janka, Münster University, Germany; Andreas Lemmerer, Johannesburg University, South Africa;  Guido J. Reiss, Düsseldorf University, Germany; Edward R. T. Tiekink, Sunway University, Malaysia

The journal is indexed in various databases and, according to the Journal Citation Reports, had a 2020 impact factor of 0.451.

Abstracting and indexing
The journal is abstracted and indexed in:
Chemical Abstracts Service
Current Contents/Physical, Chemical and Earth Sciences
EBSCO databases
Inspec
Science Citation Index Expanded
Scopus
publons
Web of Science - Current Contents/Physical, Chemical and Earth Science
Reaxys

References

External links

Chemistry journals
Crystallography journals
Quarterly journals
Publications established in 1987
English-language journals
De Gruyter academic journals